The 2001 Asian Archery Championships was the 12th edition of the event. It was held in Hong Kong from 10 to 15 December 2001 and was organized by Asian Archery Federation.

Medal summary

Recurve

Compound

Medal table

References

 Results

Asian Championship
A
Asian Archery Championships